John O'Connell is a former Gaelic footballer from County Laois.

He played on the Laois senior football team in the late 1980s and early 1990s, primarily as a forward but also in midfield.

In 1991, he played on the Laois team beaten by Meath in the final of the Leinster Senior Football Championship but won an O'Byrne Cup medal with Laois earlier that year.

With his club Courtwood, he won a Laois Junior Football Championship in 1986 and a Laois Intermediate Football Championship in 1987.

References
 Leinster GAA records
 1991 Leinster final report

Year of birth missing (living people)
Living people
Courtwood Gaelic footballers
Laois inter-county Gaelic footballers